R505 road may refer to:
 R505 road (Ireland)
 R505 road (South Africa)